The Grass-Cutting Sword is a novella by Catherynne M. Valente. It was published by Prime Books in 2006.

Plot summary 
The tale is a postmodern interpretation of the Japanese folk-tale of Ame-no-Murakumo-no-Tsurugi ("Heaven's Cloud-Gathering Sword"), which is taken from the collection of folk-lore in the Kojiki. The action shifts between the journey of the storm-god Susanoo who has been banished to earth in human form by his sister, the Sun Goddess Amaterasu, as he attempts to slay the eight-headed serpent Yamata-no-Orochi. Valente also portrays the serpent's side of the story with a twist; the tale told by Orochi is intercut or added to by the seven maidens who have been sacrificed to the monster.

References

2006 American novels
American novellas
Novels by Catherynne M. Valente
Japanese mythology in popular culture
Postmodern novels
Prime Books books